The Integratron is a  tall  cupola structure with a diameter of  designed by ufologist and contactee George Van Tassel. Van Tassel claimed the Integratron was capable of rejuvenation, anti-gravity and time travel. He built the structure in Landers, California (near Joshua Tree), following instructions that Van Tassel vehemently claimed were provided directly to him by visitors from the planet Venus. The Integratron machine was started in 1957, the structure erected in 1959. It was financed predominantly by donations, including funds from Howard Hughes.

After Van Tassel's death in 1978, the building had a series of owners (and was left in various states of disrepair) before sisters Joanne, Nancy, and Patty Karl bought it in the early 2000s. The sisters promote the Integratron as an "acoustically perfect structure", give tours and offer "sound baths" they describe as "...meditation-like sessions accompanied by tones from quartz bowls".

Construction

George Van Tassel was a former aircraft mechanic and flight inspector who moved to California's Mojave Desert to operate an airport and inn. While there, he began meditating under Giant Rock, which the Native Americans of the area held sacred. In August 1953, Van Tassel claimed he had been contacted both telepathically and later in person by people from space, who gave him a technique to rejuvenate human cell tissue. Acting on these instructions, Van Tassel began constructing the Integratron in 1954. Construction costs were partly paid for by an annual series of successful UFO conventions, the Giant Rock Spacecraft Conventions, which continued for nearly 25 years. The main structure's construction was complete circa 1959, but Van Tassel continued to work on the device until his sudden death in 1978.

Claims
According to Van Tassel, the Integratron's workings rely on the generation of strong "intermittent magnetic fields" resulting in the generation of plasma in the form of a coronal discharge and negative air ionization inside the building. The Integratron is based on the Multiple Wave Oscillator, invented by Georges Lakhovsky, a combination of a high voltage Tesla coil and a split-ring resonator that generates ultra wideband electromagnetic frequencies (EMF). Van Tassel speculated that electromagnetism affects biological cells, and believed that every biological cell has a unique resonant EMF. According to van Tassel, the generation of strong ultra wideband EMF by the Integratron "resonates" with the cell's frequency and "recharges" the cellular structure as if it were an electrical battery. Van Tassel claimed that human cells "rejuvenated" while inside the structure. Van Tassel also claimed the Integratron is intentionally constructed atop a powerful geomagnetic anomaly and its construction is entirely of non-ferromagnetic materials, the equivalent to a modern radome.

Modern uses
After Van Tassel died, there was a proposal to turn the Integratron into a disco, but that plan was never realized. The Integratron's new owners operate it as a tourist attraction and offer "sound baths" where groups of people are "exposed to harmonic sound frequencies" produced by quartz bowls, claimed to have a deep calming effect. According to one of the structure's docents, the Integratron is an "acoustically perfect sound chamber".

The Integratron was added to the National Register of Historic Places in April 2018. 

The English indie rock band Arctic Monkeys recorded part of their song "Secret Door" at the Integratron in 2008.

See also 
 Orgone

References

External links

 
 George Van Tassel – When Stars Look Down (1976)
 
  – on 1950s contactees, including Van Tassel
 

Buildings and structures in San Bernardino County, California
Mojave Desert
UFO-related phenomena
Buildings and structures completed in 1959
National Register of Historic Places in San Bernardino County, California
Round buildings